The tenth cycle of America's Next Top Model was the fourth season of the series to be aired on The CW network. The promotional catchphrase of the cycle is "New Faces, New Attitude, New York." The promotional song was "Feedback" by Janet Jackson.

A few major changes were made this season. The show was moved back to New York, after being housed in Los Angeles since cycle 4. The number of contestants was also increased to 14, after being maintained at 13 since cycle 5. Finally, the judging panel, unchanged since cycle 5, was also altered; Twiggy was replaced by model Paulina Porizkova due to the former's scheduling conflicts.

The prizes for this cycle were:

 A modeling contract with Elite Model Management
 A fashion spread and cover in Seventeen
 A 100,000 contract with CoverGirl cosmetics

The international destination for this cycle was Rome, Italy, the franchises' second of three visits to Italy throughout the current seasons.

The winner of the competition was 20-year-old Whitney Thompson from Atlantic Beach, Florida. Thompson was the first plus-size model to win the competition. This season averaged 4.23 million viewers per episode.

Contestants

(Ages stated are at start of contest)

Episodes

The Tyra Banks Show episodes

Kimberly

Months later after the second episode (see top), Kim Rydzewski appeared on the October 15, 2008 episode of the said show together with fellow cycle 10 contestants Marvita Washington, Dominique Reighard and cycle 8 winner Jaslene Gonzalez where they talked about domestic violence. Rydzewski revealed later that the true reason she quit the contest was because she experienced depression, influenced by her ex-boyfriend's suicide three months prior to the competition, which in turn, revived her experiences of her mother's suicide when she was a child.

She explained that she initially wanted to join ANTM to help her divert her emotions, but she felt that it was not working and later used a ambiguous excuse to voluntarily leave the contest. She confessed that she really likes fashion and wanted to pursue it as a career, unfortunately Rydzewski died on December 19, 2016 at the age of 29.

Summaries

Call-out order

 The contestant was eliminated
 The contestant quit the competition
  The contestant won the competition

Bottom two

 The contestant was eliminated after their first time in the bottom two
 The contestant was eliminated after their second time in the bottom two
 The contestant was eliminated after their fourth time in the bottom two
 The contestant quit the competition
 The contestant was eliminated in the final judging and placed as the runner-up

Average  call-out order
Casting call-out order and final two are not included.

Photo shoot guide
Episode 1 photo shoots: School ID (casting)
Episode 2 photo shoot: Homeless models 
Episode 3 photo shoot: "Intimates" lingeries by Elle Macpherson on a yacht by the Brooklyn Bridge
Episode 4 photo shoot: Meat packing factory 
Episode 5 photo shoot: Extreme beauty shots with paint
Episode 6 photo shoot: Music genres
Episode 7 photo shoot: Fuerza Bruta on mylar
Episode 9 photo shoot: Vintage jet setters boarding an airplane
Episode 10 Commercial: CoverGirl queen collection vibrant hue lipcolor commercial in Italian
Episode 11 photo shoot: Roman castle renaissance haute couture
Episode 12 photo shoot: Paparazzi divas
Episode 13 Commercial and photo shoot: CoverGirl lashblast mascara commercial and print ad; Seventeen magazine covers

Other cast members
 Jay Manuel
 Sutan Amrull
 Christian Marc
 Anda & Masha

Makeovers
 Allison – Dyed copper and volumized
 Amis – Long golden blonde extensions with bangs
 Marvita – Horse mane weave
 Aimee – Cut to shoulder-length with bangs and dyed red
 Claire – Buzz cut and dyed platinum blonde
 Stacy Ann – Cut short
 Lauren – Long strawberry blonde extensions 
 Katarzyna – Trimmed and dyed chocolate brown; later, bob cut
 Dominique – Bob cut and dyed dark brown; later, re-dyed dark blonde
 Fatima – Long chestnut brown weave
 Anya – Cut to shoulder-length and dyed platinum blonde with bleached eyebrows
 Whitney – Long blonde extensions

Post-Top Model careers
Katarzyna Dolinska ("Kat Doll") is signed with Elite Model Management in New York City and Ace Models in Athens, Greece, She has also walked in Athens Fashion Week S/S 09 for designers Vassilis Zoulias, Custo Barcelona, Elena Strongyliotou, Afroditi Hera. She walked for Issey Miyake in Paris Fashion Week F/W 09.10. She closed the Christophe Josse show in Paris Haute Couture fashion week S/S '09 and walked in Dilek Hanif Haute Couture S/S '09. She was one of the Top Models in Action featured in cycle 11 and was featured again in cycle 13. She was on a billboard with Jaslene Gonzalez in Times Square for a Lot 29 advertisement. She has been on the cover of Women's Wear Daily and TJF Magazine and has appeared in City Magazine, Cosmogirl, OZON, Young Magazine Greece, Cosmopolitan Greece, Diva Magazine Greece, LaMilk, L'Officiel. Gerlan Jeans Look Book, Vogue Australia, Italian Glamour, Bolero, Ninja Magazine and Tokion.
Stacy-Ann Fequiere is signed to Base Models in Miami. She has walked for various designers for Miami Funkshion fashion week and Toronto Fashion Week. She has modeled for Cooyah clothing, and appeared in the Seminole Hard Rock Hotel & Casino 2009 Calendar.  She made it to the semi-finals of the Victoria's Secret model search. She appeared in magazines like Seventeen, JamRock, Fair Lady, Winter Park, Chellea, Vocess and Glamour South Africa. She also worked for Iman's Global Chic collection on HSN.
Amis Jenkins has done some test shoots; but she revealed on the Tyra Banks Show that the show helped her realize that she is not interested in modeling, but instead wants to pursue a styling career.
Anya Kop is signed to Wilhelmina Models in New York and Style International Management in Hong Kong and was once signed with Elite Model Management. Rozova has appeared in both Level Magazine and Nylon Magazine. Rozova has appeared in several Hong Kong based publications including Elle Hong Kong, Cosmogirl Hong Kong, Marie Claire Hong Kong, Daily Sun, "Jessica Magazine" and Jessica Code. She shot a Fall 2009 campaign for the Chinese brand "Calfland". Anya has also appeared in Vogue Nippon. Anya walked the Nuj Novakhett and Julian Louie runway shows during New York Fashion Week Spring/Summer 2009 season. She also walked for shows during Hong Kong fashion week in the Fall/Winter 2009 season such as Fashion Shenzen, Taipei in Style, In Full Bloom, HK Young Fashion Designers' Contest 2009, Brands Collection Show I and The 9th Footwear Design Competition Awards Hong Kong 2009. In August 2009, Rozova was featured in Project Runway All Star Challenge as one of the models for Sweet P Vaughn's collection.
Allison Kuehn is signed to DreamModels Workshop in Hong Kong and BMG Models in Chicago. She was previously with Ford Models in Milwaukee, Vue Model Management and I Model and Talent in Los Angeles. She has been in Wedding More, Jessica Code and Pop magazine. She currently lives in Hong Kong with cycle 1's Elyse Sewell.
Dominique Reighard has signed with House of Talent pa. She has won Modelville, as a result, she is currently a spokesmodel for Carol's Daughter. She was a contestant on the first All-Star Season of America's Next Top Model. She has been seen in J'Adore, Fashion Q&A, Ebony, C Magazine and Seventeen. Reighard had also been featured on the websites of Essence and Sovereign Soles and ads for Carol's Daughter and Grove City Dental. She has walked in Philippine Fashion Week for Michael Cinco and modeled for Bench in "Bench Universe" with Sophie Sumner and Allison Harvard. Dominique has released her first music video called "On Top of the World".
Kimberly Rydzewski modeled for Twenty Three Vintage, Calico and Swimwear Plus and did some test shots. She died on December 19, 2016, aged 29.
Fatima Siad is currently signed with IMG Models NY. She has signed to New York Model Management, LA Model Management, Ace Models in Athens, Greece and Ice Models in Milan, Italy. She has been in In Fashion Magazine and Elle, March 2009 and July 2009. Siad has a contract with the Swiss cosmetic company, Arbonne and is one of the new faces for Arbonne FC5, appearing in ads for the products. She was in Marie Claire in July 2010. In addition, Siad had an ad campaign with BCBG Max Azria for their Spring/Summer 2010 campaign. She was also chosen for the Spring 2012 Herve Leger campaign by Max Azria. Fatima also walked for noted fashion houses such as Dries van Noten and Hermès during the Spring/Summer 2012 fashion week.
Atalya Slater is signed with Wilhelmina Models under the W Media division in New York and has walked for Jose Duran in New York Fashion Week and House of Dereon on the Tyra Show. She appeared in Source Magazine, New York Daily News, American Cheerleader magazine, Cosmogirl Prom F/W 2009, Cosmopolitan, April 2009 and has modeled for hair magazines. She also has a campaign with South Pole and had a Billboard in Times Square. Atalya played a female fan in the movie Notorious. She is also on the cover of the Book Friend Til the End. She has modeled on The View Elisabeth Hasselbeck's clothing line. and the clothing line Coogi. She featured in the Fabolous video "Throw it in the Bag". She has also appeared on the June 19, 2009 broadcast of The Today Show modeling swimwear and later Fall fashion. and appeared in Seventeen magazine August 2009 issue.
Whitney Thompson has collected her prizes though has since ended her representation with Elite Model Management and has since switched to Wilhelmina Models in New York. Whitney created a jewelry line called ShopSupermodel. She's also the spokesmodel for Smile Stylists, modeled for Metrostyle, JC Penney, People Magazine, Diana Warner Jewelry, Forever 21, Saks Fifth Avenue, the face for Torrid, Converse One Star, Fashion Bug, and a campaign with Pure Energy/Target, Fall 2010. She's also an ambassador for the National Eating Disorders Association, and a spokesperson for the Right Fit brand of Fashion Bug. She has also shot a CoverGirl commercial with Rihanna. In January 2010, Whitney became a model for the Faith 21 line by Forever 21. In 2015, she made an appearance on cycle 22 as a judge. 
Claire Unabia signed to Empire Model Management in New York City. She has modeled for Fati Light and has an ad for Kodak. She appeared on the cover of Parents magazine with her daughter Halina in 2007 and February 2009 and was in Unvogue, New York Daily News and Supermodels Unlimited. Recently she appeared as one of the models for Ven Budhu on Project Runway season 10's season premier. A stock photo of Unabia was used to represent the character "Juliet" on the first season of HBO's Westworld.
Lauren Utter is signed to VIP Stars Models in New York. She has done some test shoots and starred in Modelville (see above) which she later quit. She modeled for Pomp and Circumstance magazine, Thorn and Class Struggle. She also appeared in the season finale on the sixth season of Project Runway.
Marvita Washington is signed with Ikon Model Management. She appeared in Ebony Magazine, December 2008. and Supermodels Unlimited. She has walked for various designers, including at BET's Rip the Runway 2009.
Aimee Wright is signed to Heffner Model Management in Seattle, Washington.

Controversies

During the contestants’ stay in New York, the models stayed in a $6 million apartment. However, when the season was over, it was revealed the contestants had caused over $500,000 in damages. The landlord Michael Marvisi explained that the girls had left food on the walls, damaged a $15,000 chandelier “beyond repair” and caused $90,000 of damage to a store below. He also said the film crew had punched “hundreds of holes in the ceiling to hang lighting equipment.” and had torn up the Brazilian wood floors. A $125K settlement deal was reached between the landlord and America’s Next Top Model.

Notes

References

  Content in this article was copied from Cycle 10 at America's Next Top Model Wiki, which is licensed under the Creative Commons Attribution-Share Alike 3.0 (Unported) (CC-BY-SA 3.0) license.

External links
 

A10
2008 American television seasons
Television shows filmed in California
Television shows filmed in New York City
Television shows filmed in Italy